is the sixth live video album by Japanese band Wagakki Band, released on March 20, 2019 by Avex Trax in four editions: two-disc DVD, two-disc Blu-ray, and two Live CD editions. In addition, a mu-mo Shop exclusive release includes all editions and bonus DVD and Blu-ray copies of the band's  concert. The video covers the band's two-day concert at the Saitama Super Arena on January 5–6, 2019. It was the band's final release with Avex Trax before their contract expired and they signed with Universal Music Japan in June of that year.

The video peaked at No. 5 on Oricon's DVD chart and No. 10 on Oricon's Blu-ray chart.

Track listing
All tracks are arranged by Wagakki Band.

Personnel 
 Yuko Suzuhana – vocals
 Machiya – guitar
 Beni Ninagawa – tsugaru shamisen
 Kiyoshi Ibukuro – koto
 Asa – bass
 Daisuke Kaminaga – shakuhachi
 Wasabi – drums
 Kurona – wadaiko

Charts

References

External links 
 

Wagakki Band video albums
2019 live albums
Japanese-language live albums
Avex Group live albums
Avex Group video albums
Albums recorded at Saitama Super Arena